Gensler is an American design and architecture firm that was founded by architect Art Gensler (1935–2021). The surname Gensler (or Gansler) may refer to:

Artists and entertainers
Jacob Gensler (1808–1845), German painter who specialized in genre scenes
Bob Gansler (born 1941), Hungarian-born American soccer player and coach

Politicians and government officials 
Doug Gansler (born 1962), former Attorney General of Maryland (2007–2015)
Gary Gensler (born 1957), chair of the U.S. Securities and Exchange Commission (2021–present); former chair of the Commodity Futures Trading Commission (2009–2014)

Military figures 
Jacques Gansler (1934–2018), U.S. Department of Defense official; head of the Gansler Commission
Wilhelm Gänsler (1919–1985), highly decorated Luftwaffe NCO of World War II

Other
Ganslernhang, ski piste in Kitzbühel, Austria